Diana Lui (born May 7, 1968 in Malaysia) is a Franco-Belgian artist, photographer and filmmaker of Chinese origin. Diana Lui is best known for her large format photographic portraits of today's growing hybrid generation of multicultural and multiethnic individuals.

Diana Lui was born in Malaysia and has been based in Paris for more than 10 years. She graduated from the Art Center College of Design in Pasadena, California in 1992. A master with the 8×10 inch view camera, Diana Lui develops long term photographic and artistic projects over several years. Intimate Portraits, what Lui calls "intimate/psychological/anthropological portraits on today’s hybrid generation of new nomads who have lost their roots and origins due to the onslaught of globalism" was initiated 20 years ago and continues to develop to this day. Lui’s silent portraits show the existential urgency of each individual’s existence through the space or objects surrounding him/her, the intrinsic gestures and physical positioning of the individual within his/her environment. With this constantly evolving series, she has won several awards including France’s 20th Bourse du Talent (Young Talent Award for Photography) and the Prix Kodak de la Critique Photographique (Kodak Critics’ Award), Belgium’s Prix National de la Photographie Ouverte du Musée de la Photographie à Charleroi and was in 2008 a finalist for the Prix de la Fondation HSBC pour la Photographie.

Background 
Diana Lui’s interest in different art forms is due to her early education in the arts in Malaysia ranging from Chinese ink painting to the performance arts such as ballet and contemporary dance. Her studies in the fine arts in UCLA (University California Los Angeles) were guided by teachers who were prominent artists of the 1960s Post-Modernist period such as Robert Heinecken and Jan Stüssy. In UCLA, Lui experimented with drawing, painting, printmaking, sculpting and photography. She further deepened her art studies at the prestigious Art Center College of Design in Pasadena, California. Her graduation project combined printing processes such as photogravure and platinum/palladium printing in order to create subtle black and white portraits taken with an 8x10 inch view camera. Lui was able to successfully master these alternative printing processes thanks to her teacher Anthony Zepeda, Los Angeles master printmaker, a former printer of Rauschenberg's. Though photography has predominated her work, her recent projects have evolved into new themes that push the limits of photography by combining installation, performance, experimental short films, painting and drawing. Lui’s transient life between three different continents has developed in her a heightened sense of "rootlessness", loss of origins and traditional values. This "rootlessness" has become the center from which her art and research has taken shape.

Exhibitions 
Diana Lui has won several prestigious awards and exhibited her photographs and art work in solo and group exhibits in the USA, China, Malaysia, Singapore, Belgium, Paris (France), Germany, Italy, Estonia, London, Morocco, Mexico, and Venezuela.

2013
 Portraits Intimes(Intimate Portraits), Galerie Carole Decombe, Paris - Intimate Portraits was exhibited during art event Carrément Audacieux in the exclusive Carré de Beaune area of Paris
 Medusas, Jakčev dom Museum, Novo Mesto, Slovenia - a series of portraits on today's rootless generation

2012
 The Feminine Beyond, Galerija Fotografija, Ljubljana, Slovenia - a photographic exploration of the feminine identity using two contrasting subjects: the nude and the veiled
 Fotofever Brussels, Tour et Taxi - Galerie 127, Marrakech
 Dali International Photography Exhibition, Yunnan Province, China
 Milan Image Art Fair - Galerija Fotografija, Ljubljana

2011

 The Essential Veil – II, French Institute, Fez, Morocco - photos & on site installation, continuing series on the semantics of veiled and traditional costumes in Morocco
 Paris Photo, Grand Palais – Galerija Fotografija, Ljubljana - presentation of 2 portfolios edited by Editions Chez Higgins, Les Méduses(D.Lui) and Chez Robert Frank(D.Lui & K.Sluban)
 Fotofever, Espace Pierre Cardin, Paris – Galerie 127, Marrakech 
 Marrakech Art Fair, Palace Es Saadi, Morocco – Galerie 127, Marrakech

2010

 Paris Photo, Carrousel du Louvre – Galerija Fotografija
 Marrakech Art Fair, Palace Es Saadi, Morocco – Galerie 127
 The Essential Veil, Galerie 127, Marrakech – photo, video & installation exhibition, research on traditional Moroccan costumes 
 Pur-Sang, Château Maisons-Laffitte – photos & installation, catalogue 75 pages, Editions Filigranes, Paris
 Infinite River - Sentier du Rhône, Rochemaure, France – artist residence and outdoor installation, a reclining 15-meter long wavy mirror built at the entrance of an 18th-century bridge, Pont Rochemaure, in the Ardeche region.

2009

 Cut 09, Valentine Willie Fine Art Gallery, Kuala Lumpur, Malaisie et Singapour - the photographic body in South East Asia ( with artists: Manit Sriwanichpoom, I-Lann Yee, Melati Suryodarmo, etc.)
 PhotoBeijing 2009, Agricultural Exhibition Center of China, Pekin, Chine - Galerie Lipao Huang, with photographers Klavdij Sluban, Marc Riboud, Patrick Robert et Wu Jialin
 Paris Pékin, Galerie Lipao Huang, Paris - with Marc Riboud & Klavdij Sluban
 Salon Art Show & Festival AVIFF, Cannes, France - short film Four Play in competition
 Photographe sous influences, Galerie Sponte, Paris, France - photography exhibit

2008
 Another Voice, We..., Shanghai Art Museum, China - first major exhibition by women artists in the museum, exhibition on the woman's place in the globalized world today - 12 contemporary women artists from China, Russia, Japan, France, Germany (Olga Kisseleva, Danielle Vallet Kleiner, Ryoko Suzuki, Xing Danwen, etc.) - photos, installation, video
 Femmes, Arbres et Hommes, Galerie Sinitude, Paris, France - photography exhibit
 Huachen Auctions, Beijing, China
 ArtBeijing Fair, Chine

2007
 Cities of the Immortals, Guangdong Museum of Art, China - photography exhibition
 Merimetsan Alchemy, HOP gallery, Estonia - photo & installation, collaboration with fashion researcher Otto Von Busch from Gothenburg University, Sweden and Estonian artist Sirja-Liisa Vahtra combining art, design, and therapy inside a rehabilitation center in Tallinn, Estonia
 Le Conservatoire du Cap Corse, Canari - commissioned series of portraits of Corsicans with costumes from the 18th century (some costumes reconstructed by ethnologist Rennie Pecqueux-Barboni) - permanent exhibition
 ArtCurial, Paris
 Sex Market, Tallinn Art Hall(Kunstihoone), Tallinn, Estonia - exhibition by Estonian and international artists addressing prostitution in Eastern Europe, curated by Reet Varblane - photography exhibit
 Festival DesignMai, Berlin - photography exhibit of portraits of the world's most interesting designers

2006
 Trees, Individuals & Sexuality, Galerija Fotografija, Ljubljana, Slovenia - supported by the French Institute Charles Nodier - photography exhibit
 Trees, Individuals, & Sexuality, Aura Gallery, Shanghai, China - photography exhibit
 Chance, Agnès B., London - photography exhibit organized by London art magazine "Chance" 
 Lianzhou International Photo Festival, China 
 Blurred Certainty, Jerwood Space, London - photography exhibit
 15ème Prix National de Photographie, Musée de la Photographie de Charleroi, Belgium - photography exhibit of winners of the competition

2005 
 Retratos Intimos(Intimate Portraits), Museo de Bellas Artes, Caracas, Venezuela - photography exhibit

2004 
 Sensaciones, Fototeca de Monterrey, Mexico - photography and short films - with the support of the Alliance Française in Monterrey
 Millenium Museum for Contemporary Art, Beijing, China - exposition photo

2003
 Portraits Intimes, Galerie Cathay, Paris - photography exhibit
 3rd Ping Yao International Photography Festival in China

1998-2002 
 press photographer in Paris for ART & AUCTION (New York), NOVA, L’EXPRESS, LE NOUVEL OBSERVATEUR

1996
 Notices The Gallery, Singapour - black and white photography from Malaysian and Singaporean contemporary photographers
 Art Photography in Malaysia today, National Art Gallery, Kuala Lumpur, Malaisie - first photography exhibition in a major national museum in Malaysia

1995
 Eroticism in Landscape - 4th National Sutra Dance Festival - Kuala Lumpur, Malaysia - exhibition exploring the subject of eroticism by women photographers from Malaysia
 American Cultural Center, Brussels, Belgium - portraits in platinum/palladium by contemporary American and European photographers

1994
 Photographie nouvelle de Belgique - Brussels, Belgium - photography exhibit organized by l'Association Arrêt sur l'Image

1992
 Art Center College of Design, Pasadena, California - portraits in platinum/palladium

1991
 Rotunda Gallery, Los Angeles, California - photography exhibit by women photographers from Los Angeles

1990 
 Eros & Thanatos, UCLA Kerckhoff Art Gallery, University California of Los Angeles (UCLA), USA - watercolor, pastel, photography and sketches in charcoal

1989
 UCLA Kerckhoff Art Gallery, University California of Los Angeles (UCLA), USA - portraits of children from Malaysia, Mexico & Belize, drawings in charcoal, pastel, gouache and Chinese ink

Workshops 

 2005 : Images in our daily life - CEDIM, Centro de Estudios de Diseño de Monterrey, Mexique
 2007 : Art as therapy - Merimetsan Rehabilitation Center, Tallinn, Estonie
 2008 : The Naked Portrait - Les Rencontres d'Arles, France
 2009 : The Naked Portrait - Les Rencontres d'Arles, France
 2010 : The portrait, a sensitive approach - Les Rencontres d'Arles, France
 2011 : The portrait stripped bare - Les Rencontres d'Arles
 2012 : The portrait stripped bare - Les Rencontres d'Arles, Defining your Photographic Identity - Galerija Fotografija, Ljubljana, Lemasterclass - conducted by Diana Lui & Klavdij Sluban 
 2013 : The portrait stripped bare - Les Rencontres d'Arles, Defining your Photographic Identity - Galerija Fotografija, Ljubljana, The Intimate Portrait - Fotopub Festival, Lemasterclass - conducted by Diana Lui & Klavdij Sluban

Awards, Scholarships, Commissions & Residences 

2011
 Dar Batha, French Institute, Fez, Morocco - artist in residence

2010
 2nd Photographic Meeting of Maisons-Laffitte, France - artist in residence, public commission, on site installation, commissioned by Centre des Monuments Nationaux 
 Sentier du Rhône, Rochemaure, Ardeche, France – artist in residence, public commission, on site installation Rivière Infinie(Infinite River) on the Pont de Rochemaure
 Artist residence -Valentine Willie Gallery, Bali, Indonesia

2009-2010
 Artist in Residence Denise Masson, French Institute, Marrakesh, Morocco

2009
 Artist in Residence - Rimbun Dahan, center for traditional & contemporary art forms, Malaysia

2008	
 Bourse de l'Ambassade de France, Beijing, China - artist in residence & on site installation at Shanghai Art Museum
 Fondation HSBC pour la Photographie, Paris, France – finalist

2007
 Bourse du Centre Culturel Français, Tallinn, Estonia - social art therapy project, workshop, photo exhibition & installation Merimetsan Alchemy
 Conservatory for Traditional Costumes, Canari, Corsica – public commission, photography and video

2006	
 15ème Prix National Photographie Ouverte - Musée de la Photographie à Charleroi, Belgium – winner

2005
Prix FNAC Européen de la Photographie 2005, Belgium - finalist

2003
Prix Kodak de la Critique Photographique 2003, Paris, France – finalist
La 20ème Bourse du talent, Paris, France - winner for portraits category

2000
Search for Art, Bologna, Italie - finalist

Collections 

Bibliothèque nationale de France, Paris, France
Guangdong Museum of Art, China
Musée de la Photographie de Charleroi, Belgium
Museo de Bellas Artes, Caracas, Venezuela
Fototeca de Monterrey, Nuevo León, Mexico
Conservatory for Traditional Costumes, Canari, Corsica
UCLA, University California Los Angeles, USA

Publications 
 Retratos Intimos, text in English and Spanish by Tomás Rodríguez Soto (curator) & Adam Beinash (Art & Auction magazine), Museo de Bellas Artes de Caracas, Venezuela, 2005. 
 Cities of the Immortals, text by Richard Vine (Art in America magazine) & Jean Loh (guest curator), Guangdong Museum of Art, China, Beaugeste Editions, Shanghai, 2007.
 Another Voice, We..., text in English and Chinese by Xiao Xiao Lan (curator), Shanghai Art Museum, 2008. 
 Pur-Sang, Diana Lui & Klavdij Sluban, text by Thierry Dumanoir (curator), Editions Filigranes, Hors Collection, 2010. 
 Trees, Individuals & Sexuality, Aura Gallery, Shanghai, 2006
 Méduses, text by Anne Biroleau-Lemagny (general curator, Bibliothèque nationale de France), collectors' portfolio of 15 original prints, Editions Chez Higgins, Collection Vanités, Paris, 2011.
 Chez Robert Frank, photos and text by Diana Lui & Klavdij Sluban, collectors' portfolio of 15 original prints, Editions Chez Higgins, Collection Témoignages, Paris, 2011.

References 

Living people
1968 births
Art Center College of Design alumni
Malaysian photographers
French photographers
Belgian photographers
Malaysian people of Chinese descent
French people of Chinese descent
Belgian people of Chinese descent
UCLA School of the Arts and Architecture alumni
Belgian women photographers
French women photographers
Malaysian women photographers